The 1950–51 Norwegian 1. Divisjon season was the 12th season of ice hockey in Norway. Eight teams participated in the league, and Furuset IF won the championship.

Regular season

External links 
 Norwegian Ice Hockey Federation

Nor
GET-ligaen seasons
1950–51 in Norwegian ice hockey